Michail Berneanou (born 14 April 1979) is a retired Greek football defender.

He is the brother of George Berneanou (born 29 August 1984), Goalkeeper coach of FC Viktoria Koln.

References

1979 births
Living people
Greek people of Romanian descent
Greek footballers
Greece under-21 international footballers
Iraklis Thessaloniki F.C. players
Ethnikos Asteras F.C. players
Agrotikos Asteras F.C. players
Anagennisi Epanomi F.C. players
Pandramaikos F.C. players
Super League Greece players
Association football defenders